Ralph Tepel born 1964 in Celle, Lower Saxony, Germany is a German artist, working now for more than 25 years as a fine art photographer, painter, sculptor and last but not least as a sound performance artist.

Life 
He started painting, drawing and sculpturing in his childhood and youth. In school he found a catalyzer in his art teacher. 1983 he got his university entrance diploma at Wilhelm-Döpfeld-Gymnasium. He studied theology, art and design at the universities of Wuppertal, Heidelberg, and Bonn. From 1995 – 1997 he studied as a master scholar with Professor Alfons Engling, after his return from Sao Paulo, Brazil to Cologne, Germany. 
In 1995 he became acquainted with Helmut Tollmann and was working at his studio from 1998 to 2006 as an assistant and collaborator. The multi-layer work of Helmut Tollmann integrating techniques from print and photography to painting had a strong influence on Ralph Tepels artwork until today.

Work

Focus photography 1986 – 2012 
Ralph Tepel was as a fine art photographer several years member of the American Society of Picture Professionals and the Adobe Photographers Directory. An article on Ralph Tepel and his work was published in Künstlerische Fotografie heute, Band 1 (Fine art photography today, Volume 1). In the years 2007 and 2008 he was living and working in Calgary, Alberta. A lot of new artworks were originated. Photographs from more than one decade culminated in the “inspired by music”- project, shown in an exhibition and published in an art book.

Faces of constitutional law and the presidential project 2004 -2008 
Since Ralph Tepel had created a series of paintings of the men and women of the Parliamentary Council under the exhibition title “faces of constitutional law”, Christian Kiefer invited him to take part in the music and art Presidential Project “Of great and mortal men” of J. Matthew Gerken, Christian Kiefer and Jefferson Pitcher with the portrait of Richard Nixon.

Liberty as a guiding theme 2009 – 2014 
After moving his studio from Cologne to Solingen, he was looking for new forms of expression always with the guiding theme liberty and freedom. The political implications of his painting and sculpturing focused on the loss of liberty through digitization and economization of the society. These works were shown at the Kornelius gallery at the beginning of 2015.

The Myth Game 2015 
The death of his father and his own severe accident were profound experience that changed his vision of the world and his artwork eradicative. He dealt intensely with the work of Jean-Michel Basquiat and met with a completely new Expression of his own, that led him to the Myth Game in appeal to Ludwig Wittgenstein and Roland Barthes, the “Sprachspiel” (language game) and “the everyday myth”.

The Superimposition or the modern palimpsest 2017 
playing with layers and information led him to his new "playground" the extinction of information by superimposition. Working with a lot of new techniques like laminating, sanding image layers, framing and edging image information layers.

Selected exhibitions 

 2005 soul landscapes, solo exhibition, Thessaloniki
 2006 icons of humanity, HYPE Gallery, Berlin;
 2006 ralph tepel photographs, solo exhibition, Sani
 2007 art of object, Calgary
 2008 artwork Richard Nixon for „of great and mortal men”, USA
 2008 inspired by music, solo exhibition and book, Calgary
 2009 5th Street Gallery, Dayton, OH, USA
 2009 Art meets Carnival, Cologne, Germany
 2010 gallery sanssouci, fluidum, Solingen, Germany
 2010 Nature and Man, International Art Exhibition, St. Andreasberg, Germany
 2010 alles paletti, Solingen, Germany
 2014 colors of fall, gallery Rhineland, Solingen
 2014 10. ways to plainness, Schloss Mitsuko, Todendorf, Germany
 2015 the thoughts are free, Kornelius gallery, Aachen, Germany
 2015 open studio exhibition: “entire life on a computer chip”, culture morning, Solingen
 2015 producer, assistant editor and composer „panta rei“ by Helmut Tollmann,  K.U.L.T., Bedburg
 2015 Wege zur Schlichtheit 11 MUGA (Selbstvergessenheit) – 第11回 簡素への彷徨展, group exhibition, Schloss Mitsuko, Todendorf
 2015 Ralph Tepel: myth games- the encounter,  solo exhibition, k1-gallery, Solingen
 2015 Literature illuminated- four installations at Festival of Light 2015, solo exhibition at the Bachtor-Centrum, Solingen
 2015 KUNST ist immer ein Geschenk – group Exhibition, k1 gallery, Solingen
 2016 Ralph Tepel: West-östlicher Divan, solo exhibition, k1-gallery, Solingen
 2016 Wege zur Schlichtheit 12 Toki no Nagare – Fließende Zeit, group exhibition, Schloss Mitsuko, Todendorf
 2017 Kunst und Gegenwart, 80 Galerie, group exhibition, Berlin, Germany
 2017 Wege zur Schlichtheit 13  Fragilität des Daseins, group exhibition, Schloss Mitsuko, Todendorf
 2017 Ralph Tepel – Malerei, Bildhauerei, Installationen, solo exhibition, galerie dr. jochim, Celle
 2017 Ralph Tepel - sculptures, k1 gallery, solo exhibition, Solingen

External links 
 Website Ralph Tepel
 Website Ralph Tepel - fine art photography
 website Ralph Tepel faces of constitutional law
 Official website Of great and mortal men
 artaddiction online art museum
 Aachener Nachrichten, Newspaper Aachen March 5th, 2015
 Peripheral ARTeries art review, special summer issue July 2015, pages 4-18
 Catalogue k1 gallery 2015/16 west eastern divan exhibition by Ralph Tepel 2016
 Catalogue Fluidum 2010
 Catalogue no liberty island 2015, k1 edition, Cologne, Solingen, Ankara 2017
 Catalogue Ralph Tepel Malerei, Skulpturen, Installation gallery dr. jochim Celle, k1 edition Cologne, Solingen, Ankara 2017

References 

20th-century German painters
German male painters
21st-century German painters
21st-century German sculptors
21st-century German male artists
20th-century German sculptors
20th-century German male artists
German male sculptors
1964 births
Living people
Fine art photographers